Maria Murărescu, (1 October 1947 – 30 January 2014) better known as Marioara Murărescu, was a well-known Romanian producer of folkloric television shows, being renowned for TVR's  (i.e. 'Folk treasure').

References 

1947 births
2014 deaths
People from Câmpulung
Knights of the Order of the Star of Romania
Romanian musicologists
Women musicologists
Romanian folklorists
Women folklorists
Romanian television presenters
Romanian women television presenters
Burials at Cernica Monastery Cemetery